The Church of St Petrock in Timberscombe, Somerset, England has a 15th-century tower, the rest of the building dating from 1708. It has been designated by English Heritage as a Grade I listed building.

The church is dedicated to Saint Petroc, who probably visited the parish in the 6th century.

The chancel dates from around 1450, however sections of the nave walls may survive from an earlier building. Above the south doorway is a mural of David which dates from the Protestant Reformation. The font is 15th century and the pulpit from the 17th.

The tower which was built in the early 18th century, has a peel of eight bells.

The parish is part of the benefice of Dunster, Carhampton, Withycombe with Rodhuish, Timberscombe and Wootton Courtenay within the Exmoor deanery.

See also

 Grade I listed buildings in West Somerset
 List of Somerset towers
 List of ecclesiastical parishes in the Diocese of Bath and Wells

References

External links

Timberscombe website at www.timberscombevillage.com 

Church of England church buildings in West Somerset
Churches completed in 1708
Grade I listed churches in Somerset
Grade I listed buildings in West Somerset
1708 establishments in England
Churches dedicated to St Petroc